Vito De Grisantis (20 August 1941 – 1 April 2010) was an Italian Bishop of the Roman Catholic Diocese of Ugento-Santa Maria di Leuca from his appointment by Pope John Paul II on 26 June 2000, until his death on 1 April 2010.

Vito De Grisantis was born in Lecce, Italy.

He died on 1 April 2010, in Tricase, Italy, at the age of 68.

External links
Catholic Hierarchy: Bishop Vito De Grisantis †

1941 births
2010 deaths
People from Lecce
Bishops in Apulia